Richard Hewitt may refer to:

Richard Hewitt (cricketer) (1844–1920), Australian cricketer
Richard Thornton Hewitt (1917–1994), British Army officer
Dick Hewitt (1943–2017), footballer

See also
Richard Hewet (died 1519), English politician